Pitchin is an unincorporated community in Clark County, in the U.S. state of Ohio.

History
The first permanent settlement at Pitchin was made in the 1840s when several houses and shops were built there. A sawmill was built at the site in 1854. According to tradition, the town's name is derived from an idiom, specifically "pitch in". Some say the proprietor of a mill told all job seekers to "pitch in" and help him build the mill, while others believe a merchant invited townspeople to "pitch in" and help him drink a keg of beer at his new store. A post office called Pitchin was established in 1884, and remained in operation until 1903.

References

Unincorporated communities in Clark County, Ohio
1840s establishments in Ohio
Unincorporated communities in Ohio